The 2022 Arab Cup U-17 is the fourth edition of the Arab Cup U-17, an association football tournament between Arab countries. It will be played from 23 August to 8 September 2022 in Algeria in Oran which represent the administrative organization of the tournament, and two other cities, Sig and Mostaganem which they holds each ones the football matches.

Iraq won the previous tournament in 2014, but were eliminated in the quarter-finals. Host Algeria won the tournament for the first time after beating Morocco on penalties 4–2.

Teams 
16 teams took part to the tournament. The draw took place on 31 July 2022 in Abha, Saudi Arabia.

Seedings

Venues
The city of Oran hosts the tournament but two stadiums from two other cities, Sig and Mostaganem were allocated to host the matches.

Officiating

Referees

  Elias Bekouassa
  Mahmoud Nagy
  Mohamed Salman
  Usama Hasan
  Ammar Ashkanani
  Maher El Ali
  Ahmed Al-Zaruq
  Mostafa Kachef
  Mahmoud Salem Hameed
  Mohammed Abu Shahla
  Shukri Al-Hanfush
  Ameen Al-Hadi
  Muhammad Suleiman Kanat
  Mohamed Yousri Bouali
  Yahya Al-Mulla
  Mokhtar Al-Arami

Assistant referees

  Mohamed Serradj
  Brahim Hamlaoui
  Abdelmajid El-Zalan
  Hany Abdelfattah
  Hussein Falah Munshid
  Ali Berri
  Monji Abu Shikiwa
  Ahmed Ibrahim
  Hamza Naciri
  Nasser Saidi
  Khaldun Abu Qbita
  Faisal Al-Qahtani
  Muleed Rajah Ali
  Naji Al-Fateh
  Mohammad Qazzaz
  Youssef El-Jami

Squads

Group stage
The group winners and the two best second-placed teams advance to the quarter-finals.

Group A

Group B

Group C

Group D

Knockout stage

Bracket

Quarter-finals

Semi-finals

Final

Statistics

Goalscorers

Broadcasting rights
The channels that will cover the competition are the two Algerian channels  Algeria 6 and Algeria Web and also all the channels who are members of the Arab States Broadcasting Union (ASBU).

References

External links
2022 Arab Cup U-17 - UAFA official website

Arab Cup U-17
Arab Cup U-17
Arab Cup U-17
2022
Football